This is a select annotated bibliography of scholarly English language books (including translations) and journal articles about the subject of Genocide studies; for bibliographies of genocidal acts or events, please see the See also section for individual articles. A brief selection of English translations of primary sources is included for items related to the development of Genocide studies. Book entries may have references to journal articles and reviews as annotations. Additional bibliographies can be found in many of the book-length works listed below; see Further Reading for several book and chapter-length bibliographies. The External links section contains entries for publicly available materials on the development of Genocide studies.

Overview
Inclusion criteria
This bibliography is about the subject of Genocide studies; works about the history of acts of genocide are not included. Included works should either be published by an academic or notable publisher, or be authored by an independent notable subject matter expert and have reviews in significant independent scholarly journals. This bibliography specifically excludes self-published works; magazines and newspaper articles; works produced as propaganda; and works produced by non-academic government entities.

Formatting and citation style
This bibliography uses APA style citations. Entries do not use templates; references to reviews and notes for entries do use citation templates. Where books which are only partially related to the subject of genocide are listed, the titles for chapters or sections should be indicated if possible, meaningful, and not excessive.

If a work has been translated into English, the translator should be included and a footnote with appropriate bibliographic information for the original language version should be included.

When listing book titles with alternative English spellings, the form used in the latest published version should be used and the version and relevant bibliographic information noted if it previously was published or reviewed under a different title.

General surveys
 Davidson, P. L. (2012). Cultural Genocide. Rutgers University Press.
 Jones, Adam. (2016). Genocide: A Comprehensive Introduction (3rd edition). Routledge.
 Shelton D. (2005). Encyclopedia of genocide and crimes against humanity. Thomson Gale.
 Üngör, U. Ü. (Ed.). (2016). [Genocide]. Amsterdam University Press.

Topical works
 Abed, M. (2015). The Concept of Genocide Reconsidered. Social Theory and Practice, 41(2), 328–356. 
 Akesson, B., & Basso, A. R. (2022). From Bureaucracy to Bullets: Extreme Domicide and the Right to Home. Rutgers University Press.
 Anstett, É., & Dreyfus, J.-M. (Eds.). (2014). Destruction and Human Remains: Disposal and Concealment in Genocide and Mass Violence. Manchester University Press.
 Bachman, J. (2019). The United States and Genocide. Routledge.
 Bachman, J. (Ed.). (2019). Cultural Genocide: Law, Politics, and Global Manifestations. Routledge.
 Bachman, J. S. (2022). The Politics of Genocide: From the Genocide Convention to the Responsibility to Protect. Rutgers University Press. 
 Bemporad, E., & Warren, J. W. (Eds.). (2018). Women and Genocide: Survivors, Victims, Perpetrators. Indiana University Press. 
 Benesch, S. (2004). Inciting Genocide, Pleading Free Speech. World Policy Journal, 21(2), 62–69. 
  
 Brantlinger, P. (2003). Dark Vanishings: Discourse on the Extinction of Primitive Races, 1800-1930 (1st ed.). Cornell University Press. 
 Campbell, B. (2009). Genocide as Social Control. Sociological Theory, 27(2), 150–172. 
 Campbell, B. (2015). The Geometry of Genocide: A Study in Pure Sociology. University of Virginia Press.
 Card, C. (2003). Genocide and Social Death. Hypatia, 18(1), 63–79. 
 Clarke, A. W. (2012). Rendition to Torture. Rutgers University Press.
 Daar, J. (2017). The New Eugenics: Selective Breeding in an Era of Reproductive Technologies. Yale University Press.
 Feierstein, D., & Town, D. A. (2014). Defining the Concept of Genocide. In Genocide as Social Practice: Reorganizing Society under the Nazis and Argentina’s Military Juntas (pp. 11–38). Rutgers University Press. 
 Freeman, M. (1995). Genocide, Civilization and Modernity. The British Journal of Sociology, 46(2), 207–223. 
 Gobodo-Madikizela, P. (Ed.). (2016). Breaking Intergenerational Cycles of Repetition: A Global Dialogue on Historical Trauma and Memory. Verlag Barbara Budrich. 
 Hiebert, M. S. (2019). Constructing Genocide and Mass Violence: Society, Crisis, Identity. Routledge.
 Hinton, P. A. L. (Ed.). (2011). Transitional Justice: Global Mechanisms and Local Realities after Genocide and Mass Violence. Rutgers University Press.
 Hu, A. C. (2016). “Genocide” Taboo Why We’re Afraid of the G-Word. Harvard International Review, 37(4), 4–6. 
 Karazsia, Z. A. (2018). An Unfulfilled Promise: The Genocide Convention and the Obligation of Prevention. Journal of Strategic Security, 11(4), 20–31. 
 van Krieken, R. (2004). Rethinking Cultural Genocide: Aboriginal Child Removal and Settler-Colonial State Formation. Oceania, 75(2), 125–151. 
 Kühne, T. (2010). Belonging and Genocide. Yale University Press.
 Mako, S. (2012). Cultural Genocide and Key International Instruments: Framing the Indigenous Experience. International Journal on Minority and Group Rights, 19(2), 175–194.
 Mayersen, D. (Ed.). (2016). The United Nations and Genocide: 2016. Palgrave Macmillan.
 Melson, R. (1996). Paradigms of Genocide: The Holocaust, the Armenian Genocide, and Contemporary Mass Destructions. The Annals of the American Academy of Political and Social Science, 548, 156–168. 
 Monroe, K. R. (2012). Ethics in an Age of Terror and Genocide: Identity and Moral Choice. Princeton University Press.
 Moses A. Dirk (2010). Genocide : Critical Concepts in Historical Studies. Abingdon: Routledge.
 Moses, A. Dirk (Ed.). (2008). Empire, Colony, Genocide: Conquest, Occupation, and Subaltern Resistance in World History. Berghahn Books.
 Moses, A. Dirk, Joeden-Forgey, E. von, Feierstein, D., Frieze, D.-L., Nunpa, M., Richmond, W., Jones, A., Hinton, P. A. L., Travis, H., & Hegburg, K. (2013). Hidden Genocides: Power, Knowledge, Memory (A. L. Hinton, T. L. Pointe, & D. Irvin-Erickson, Eds.). Rutgers University Press.
 O’Brien, M. (2022). From Discrimination to Death: Genocide Process Through a Human Rights Lens. Routledge.
 Rafter, N. (2016). The Crime of All Crimes: Toward a Criminology of Genocide. NYU Press.
 Rechtman, R., & Turner, L. (2021). Living in Death: Genocide and Its Functionaries. Fordham University Press. 
 Robben, Antonius C.G.M. and Alexander Laban Hinton (2023). Perpetrators: Encountering Humanity’s Dark Side. Stanford: Stanford University Press. ISBN 978-1-503-63427-5. 
 Rummel, R. J. (1994). Power, Genocide and Mass Murder. Journal of Peace Research, 31(1), 1–10. 
 Sagall, S. (2013). Final Solutions: Human Nature, Capitalism and Genocide. Pluto Press. 
 Sainati, T. E. (2012). Toward A Comparative Approach To The Crime Of Genocide. Duke Law Journal, 62(1), 161–202. 
 Sartre, Jean-Paul (1968). On genocide: And a summary of the evidence and the judgments of the International War Crimes Tribunal. Boston: Beacon Press. 
 van Schaack, B. (1997). The Crime of Political Genocide: Repairing the Genocide Convention’s Blind Spot. The Yale Law Journal, 106(7), 2259–2291. 
 Shaw, Martin. “Britain and genocide: historical and contemporary parameters of national responsibility.” Review of International Studies 37 (2011): 2417 - 2438.
 Spencer, P. (2013). Imperialism, Anti-Imperialism and the Problem of Genocide, Past and Present. History, 98(4 (332)), 606–622.
 Stannard, David (1992). American holocaust : the conquest of the new world. Oxford University Press USA. 
 Stannard, David (1996). "Uniqueness as Denial: The Politics of Genocide Scholarship", published in Is the Holocaust Unique? edited by Alan S. Rosenbaum. Westview Press. Boulder, Colorado, USA.  
 Staub, E. (1992). The Roots of Evil: The Origins of Genocide and Other Group Violence (Revised edition). Cambridge University Press.
 Straus, S. (2015). Making and Unmaking Nations: War, Leadership, and Genocide in Modern Africa. Cornell University Press.
 Theriault, H. C. (2010). Genocidal Mutation and the Challenge of Definition. Metaphilosophy, 41(4), 481–524. 
 Valentino, B. A. (2013). Final Solutions: Mass Killing and Genocide in the 20th Century. Cornell University Press.
 Weiss-Wendt, A., & Irvin-Erickson, D. (2018). A Rhetorical Crime: Genocide in the Geopolitical Discourse of the Cold War. Rutgers University Press.
 Weitz, E. D. (2015). A Century of Genocide: Utopias of Race and Nation (Revised edition). Princeton University Press.
 Williams, T. (2020). The Complexity of Evil: Perpetration and Genocide. Rutgers University Press.

Prevention
 Barkan, E., Goschler, C., & Waller, J. (Eds.). (2022). Historical Dialogue and the Prevention of Mass Atrocities. Routledge.
 Harff, B., & Gurr, T. R. (Eds.). (2018). Preventing Mass Atrocities: Policies and Practices. Routledge.

Conventions and Agreements
 Kunz, J. L. (1949). The United Nations Convention on Genocide. The American Journal of International Law, 43(4), 738–746.

Legal
 Greenawalt, A. K. A. (1999). Rethinking Genocidal Intent: The Case for a Knowledge-Based Interpretation. Columbia Law Review, 99(8), 2259–2294. 
 Greenfield, D. M. (2008). The Crime of Complicity in Genocide: How the International Criminal Tribunals for Rwanda and Yugoslavia Got It Wrong, and Why It Matters. The Journal of Criminal Law and Criminology, 98(3), 921–952. 
 Ristea, I. (2011). The Concept Of Genocide In International Law. Geopolitics, History, and International Relations, 3(1), 221–226.

Biographical
 Irvin-Erickson, D. (2017). Raphael Lemkin and the Concept of Genocide. University of Pennsylvania Press.

Gender and sexual violence
 Eboe-Osuji, C. (2012). International Law and Sexual Violence in Armed Conflicts. Brill.
 Fitzpatrick, B. (2016). Tactical rape in war and conflict: International recognition and response. Bristol University Press. 
 Mackinnon, C. A. (2005). Genocide’s Sexuality. Nomos, 46, 313–356.

White genocide conspiracy theory

 Dyck, K. (2019). “They’ll Take Away Our Birthrights”: How White-Power Musicians Instill Fear of White Extinction. In T. D. Boyce & W. M. Chunnu (Eds.), Historicizing Fear: Ignorance, Vilification, and Othering (pp. 73–87). University Press of Colorado. 
 Kamali, S. (2021). White Genocide: Grievances of White Nationalists. In Homegrown Hate: Why White Nationalists and Militant Islamists Are Waging War against the United States (1st ed., pp. 113–136). University of California Press. 
 Temoney, K. E. (2020). Anatomizing White Rage: “Race is My Religion!” and “White Genocide.” In S. C. Finley, B. M. Gray, & L. L. Martin (Eds.), The Religion of White Rage: Religious Fervor, White Workers and the Myth of Black Racial Progress (pp. 149–165). Edinburgh University Press.

Historiography and memory studies
 Stone, Dan (2011). The historiography of genocide. Palgrave Macmillan.
 Murray, S. W. (Ed.). (2017). Understanding Atrocities: Remembering, Representing and Teaching Genocide. University of Calgary Press.

Reference works
 Bloxham, D., & Moses, A. D. (2010). The Oxford Handbook of Genocide Studies. Oxford University Press.

Academic journals
 Genocide Studies International; 
 Genocide Studies and Prevention: An International Journal
 Holocaust and Genocide Studies
 Journal of Genocide Research

Primary sources
Works below are items related to the development of Genocide studies.
 Key Writings of Raphael Lemkin on Genocide
 Raphael Lemkin papers, 1947-1959, New York Public Library Archives and Manuscripts.
 Raphael Lemkin Collection, The Center for Jewish History.
 Lemkin, R. (1946). Genocide. The American Scholar, 15(2), 227–230. 
 Lemkin, R. (1949). Genocide: A Commentary on the Convention. The Yale Law Journal, 58(7), 1142–1160.

See also
 Bibliography of the Holocaust
 Bibliography of the Rwandan genocide
 Bibliography of the Armenian genocide

References

Notes

Citations

Further reading
 Tinnes, J. (2015). Bibliography: Genocide (since 1980) (Part 1). Perspectives on Terrorism, 9(2), 80–114. 
 Tinnes, J. (2019). Bibliography: Genocide (since 1980) (Part 2). Perspectives on Terrorism, 13(1), 163–196.

External links
 Defining an Unimaginable Crime: The Story of Raphael Lemkin, United States Holocaust Memorial Museum.
 Bibliographies, Genocide Studies Program, Yale University.

Genocide